Lyubomir Oresharov (born April 1, 1940) is a Bulgarian sprint canoer who competed in the early 1960s. At the 1960 Summer Olympics in Rome, he was eliminated in the repechages of the K-2 1000 m event.

Oresharov withdrew from the heats in the K-1 1000 m event at those same games.

References
Sports-reference.com profile

1940 births
Bulgarian male canoeists
Canoeists at the 1960 Summer Olympics
Living people
Olympic canoeists of Bulgaria